Supersnazz is the debut studio album by the rock band the Flamin' Groovies. It was released in 1969 on the Epic label. The release was their only album recorded expressly for a major record label, although all of their next five albums were distributed by major labels.  Supersnazz was later released in compact disc format in 2000 on Sundazed Records with four edits of songs from the album (done in 1969 for singles) included as bonus tracks.

Track listing
Side 1
 "Love Have Mercy" (Roy Loney)
 "The Girl Can't Help It" (Bobby Troup)
 "Laurie Did It" (Roy Loney)
 "A Part From That" (Roy Loney, Cyril Jordan)
 "Rockin' Pneumonia and the Boogie Woogie Flu" (Huey Smith, Johnny Vincent)

Side 2
 "The First One's Free" (Roy Loney)
 "Pagan Rachel" (Roy Loney)
 "Somethin' Else" (Eddie Cochran) / "Pistol Packin' Mama" (Al Dexter)
 "Brushfire" (Roy Loney, Cyril Jordan)
 "Bam Balam" (Roy Loney, Cyril Jordan)
 "Around the Corner" (Roy Loney, Cyril Jordan)

 2000 Sundazed CD bonus tracks
 "Rockin' Pneumonia and the Boogie Woogie Flu" (single edit)
 "The First One's Free" (single edit)
 "Somethin' Else" (single edit)
 "Laurie Did It" (single edit)

Personnel
Flamin' Groovies
Roy Loney - rhythm guitar, vocals
Cyril Jordan - guitar, vocals
Tim Lynch - guitar, vocals, harmonica
George Alexander - bass guitar, vocals, harmonica
Danny Mihm - drums, percussion
Mike Lang - keyboards

References

Flamin' Groovies albums
1969 debut albums
Epic Records albums